There are a number of deities and personifications associated with seasons in various mythologies, traditions, and fiction.

Winter
Kheimon, from Greek kheima, a hora of winter, early ancient Greece
Hiems, the Roman personification of winter.
Beira, Queen of Winter, also Cailleach Bheur, a personification or deity of winter in Gaelic mythology
Boreas (Βορέας, Boréas; also Βορρᾶς, Borrhás) was the Greek god of the cold north wind and the bringer of winter. His name meant "North Wind" or "Devouring One". His name gives rise to the adjective "boreal".
Despoina (Δέσποινα) is the daughter of Poseidon and Demeter, greek goddess of winter and frost
Khione (from χιών – chiōn, "snow") is the daughter of Boreas and Greek goddess of snow
Ded Moroz (literally "Grandfather Frost"), a Russian substitute of Santa Claus
Father Winter – Albanian mythology 
Itztlacoliuhqui, deified personification of winter-as-death in Aztecan mythology
Jack Frost
Tengliu, Snow goddess from Chinese mythology. 
 the Great Winter God (冬大神), of Ba Jia Jiang (The Eight Generals), originated from the Chinese folk beliefs and myths
Marzanna, slavic Goddess of Winter, Death, and Rebirth (also Marena, Morena, Morana, Mara, Maslenitsa).
Morozko, from a Russian fairy tale, translated as Father Frost
Old Man Winter, personification of winter.
Skaði (sometimes anglicized as Skadi, Skade, or Skathi) is a jötunn and goddess associated with bowhunting, skiing, winter, and mountains in Norse mythology
Hine-Takurua Personification of the winter in Māori mythology and one Tamanuiterā, the sun god's two wives
Three Friends of Winter in Chinese art, the plum, bamboo and pine.
Shakok the god of winter the North Mountain in Native American mythology
Nane Sarma, Granma Frost, Iranian folklore.

Spring

Brigid, celtic Goddess of Fire, the Home, poetry and the end of winter. Her festival, Imbolc, is on 1st or 2nd of February which marks "the return of the light".
Ēostre or Ostara, the Anglo-saxon goddess of spring
Persephone, greek Goddess of Spring. Her festival or the day she returns to her mother Demeter from the Underworld is on 3rd of April.
Many fertility deities are also associated with spring
In  Roman mythology, Flora was a Sabine-derived goddess of flowers and of the season of spring 
Ver, the Roman personification of spring.
Jarylo (Cyrillic: Ярило or Ярила; ; ; ; Slavic: Jarovit), alternatively Yarylo, Iarilo, or Gerovit, is a Slavic god of vegetation, fertility and springtime.
Eiar, a hora of spring, classic ancient Greece.
the great Spring God (春大神), of Ba Jia Jiang (The Eight Generals), originated from the Chinese folk beliefs and myths
Morityema the god of spring & the West Mountain in Native American mythology.

Summer
 Áine, Irish goddess of love, summer, wealth and sovereignty, associated with the sun and midsummer
Theros, a hora of summer, classic ancient Greece
Aestas, the Roman personification of summer.
Damia, a hora of summer, early ancient Greece
the Great Summer God (夏大神), of Ba Jia Jiang (The Eight Generals), originated from the Chinese folk beliefs and myths
Freyr, Norse god of summer, sunlight, life and rain
Hine-Raumati, Personification of the summer from Māori mythology
Miochin the god of summer & the South Mountain in Native American Mythology

Autumn
Pthinoporon, from Greek phthinophôron, a hora of autumn, classic ancient Greece
Autumnus, the Roman personification of autumn.
the Great Autumn God (秋大神), of Ba Jia Jiang (The Eight Generals), originated from the Chinese folk beliefs and myths
Shruisthia the god of autumn & the East Mountain in Native American Mythology

Anemoi
In ancient Greek mythology Anemoi were the gods of wind, three of which were associated with seasons:
Boreas (Septentrio in Latin) was the north wind and bringer of cold winter air 
Zephyrus or Zephyr (Favonius in Latin) was the west wind and bringer of light spring and early summer breezes
Notos or Notus (Auster in Latin) was the south wind and bringer of the storms of late summer and autumn. Notos not only brings rain and heavy downpour, but he can also bring extremely hot air (avg. 45°C) especially in the South parts of greece.
Eurus (Eurus in Latin) was the East Wind & bringer of warmth & rain

References

Seasons
Seasons
Personifications of weather
Seasons